In enzymology, a protein geranylgeranyltransferase type I is an enzyme that catalyzes the chemical reaction

geranylgeranyl diphosphate + protein-cysteine  S-geranylgeranyl-protein + diphosphate

Thus, the two substrates of this enzyme are geranylgeranyl diphosphate and protein-cysteine, whereas its two products are S-geranylgeranyl-protein and diphosphate.

This enzyme belongs to the family of transferases, specifically those transferring aryl or alkyl groups other than methyl groups.  The systematic name of this enzyme class is geranylgeranyl-diphosphate:protein-cysteine geranyltransferase. Other names in common use include GGTase-I, and GGTaseI.

Structural studies

References

 
 
 Sinnott, M. (Ed.), Comprehensive Biological Catalysis. A Mechanistic Reference, vol. 1, Academic Press, San Diego, CA, 1998, p. 31-118.

EC 2.5.1
Enzymes of known structure